USS Arvilla (SP-752) was a United States Navy patrol vessel in commission from 1917 to 1919.

Arvilla was built as a private motorboat of the same name by Joe Fellows at Wilmington, Delaware. In 1917, the U.S. Navy acquired her under a free lease from her owner, Harry Fisher of San Diego, California, for use as a section patrol boat during World War I. She was commissioned on 5 May 1917 as USS Arvilla (SP-752), although the Navy did not actually take possession of her from Fisher until 24 June 1917.

Assigned to the 12th Naval District, Arvilla was tasked with patrol duties in San Diego Harbor and environs. While patrolling on 2 August 1917, she sank after the fishing vessel Higo accidentally rammed her. Raised and repaired, she returned to her patrol duties, which she carried out for the remainder of World War I.

Arvilla was decommissioned in January 1919. She was stricken from the Navy List on 12 March 1919 and returned to Fisher the same day.

Notes

References

Department of the Navy Naval History and Heritage Command Online Library of Selected Images: Civilian Ships: Arvilla (American Motor Boat). Served as USS Arvilla (SP-752) in 1917-1919
NavSource Online: Section Patrol Craft Photo Archive Arvilla (SP 752)

Ships built in Wilmington, Delaware
Patrol vessels of the United States Navy
World War I patrol vessels of the United States
Maritime incidents in 1917
Ships sunk in collisions
Shipwrecks of the California coast
World War I shipwrecks in the Pacific Ocean